Patty Fendick and Jill Hetherington were the defending champions but lost in the quarterfinals to Gretchen Magers and Robin White.

Elise Burgin and Rosalyn Fairbank won in the final 4–6, 6–3, 6–3 against Magers and White.

Seeds
Champion seeds are indicated in bold text while text in italics indicates the round in which those seeds were eliminated.

 Patty Fendick /  Jill Hetherington (quarterfinals)
 Betsy Nagelsen /  Pam Shriver (first round)
 Gigi Fernández /  Lori McNeil (semifinals)
 Isabelle Demongeot /  Nathalie Tauziat (semifinals)

Draw

External links
 1989 Great American Bank Classic Doubles Draw

Southern California Open
1989 WTA Tour